Evan Marginson (20 March 1909 – 16 November 1977) was an Australian politician. He was a Labor member of the Legislative Assembly of Queensland from 1969 to 1977, representing Ipswich East until 1972 and Wolston thereafter.

Marginson was a former goalkeeper for Blackstone Rovers, Booval Stars and Rosebells, before becoming a tennis player and administrator with state Tennis Association.

References

	

1909 births
1977 deaths
Members of the Queensland Legislative Assembly
Australian Labor Party members of the Parliament of Queensland
20th-century Australian politicians